Flook may refer to:

People with the surname
 Adrian Flook (born 1963), British politician
 Chris Flook (born 1973), Bermudan swimmer
 John Gurley Flook (1839–1926), American politician
 Maria Flook, American writer

Other uses
 Flook (app), an iPhone application
 Flook (band), an Anglo-Irish band
 Flook (comic strip)

See also 
 Parker v. Flook, a 1978 United States Supreme Court case
 Fluke (disambiguation)